Hocus Pocus is an album released by Enon. It was released September 9, 2003, on Touch and Go Records.

The album contains a URL to a hidden website that can be seen by removing the black disc holder in the jewel case.

Track listing
 "Shave" – 2:46
 "The Power of Yawning" – 3:44
 "Murder Sounds" – 3:53
 "Storm the Gates" – 3:50
 "Daughter in the House of Fools" – 2:52
 "Mikazuki" – 2:48
 "Candy" – 2:46
 "Monsoon" – 2:56
 "Utz" – 2:21
 "Spanish Boots" – 3:14
 "Starcastic" – 2:54
 "Litter in the Glitter" – 1:40
 "Hocus Pocus" – 2:35

References

External links
Hocus Pocus at MusicBrainz

2003 albums
Touch and Go Records albums
Enon (band) albums